Roland Howard Solomon (born February 6, 1956 in Fort Worth, Texas) was an American football cornerback in the National Football League for the Buffalo Bills, Dallas Cowboys, and the Denver Broncos.  He played college football at the University of Utah.

References

1956 births
Living people
Utah Utes football players
People from Fort Worth, Texas
American football cornerbacks
Buffalo Bills players
Dallas Cowboys players
Denver Broncos players